Kyle Copeland-Muse (born May 19, 1961) is an American former professional tennis player.

Biography
Copeland, a native of Montclair, New Jersey, graduated from Montclair High School. She is credited as the first black tennis player to appear for Louisiana State University in the SEC. She completed her collegiate career at Pepperdine University, graduating in 1982.

In 1983 she won her biggest professional title when she partnered with Lori McNeil to win the $50,000 Bakersfield Open, an event that was part of the WTA's Virginia Slims series.

Copeland featured in the doubles main draw of the French Open, Wimbledon and US Open during her career.

Many sources mistakingly display her given name as Kylie.

WTA Tour finals

Doubles: 2 (1-1)

References

External links
 
 

1961 births
Living people
American female tennis players
African-American female tennis players
Montclair High School (New Jersey) alumni
Sportspeople from Essex County, New Jersey
Tennis people from New Jersey
People from Montclair, New Jersey
LSU Lady Tigers tennis players
Pepperdine Waves women's tennis players
21st-century African-American people
20th-century African-American sportspeople
20th-century African-American women
20th-century African-American people
21st-century African-American women